Łękawica  is a village in the administrative district of Gmina Stryszów, within Wadowice County, Lesser Poland Voivodeship, in southern Poland.

The village has a population of 1,200.

References

Villages in Wadowice County